The 2019–20 season was Walsall's 132nd season in their existence and first back in League Two following the club's relegation in the 2018-19 season. Along with competing in League Two, the club participated in the FA Cup, League Cup and EFL Trophy.

The season covers the period from 1 July 2019 indefinitely due to the COVID-19 pandemic.

Pre-season
The Saddlers announced pre-season fixtures against Alfreton Town, Leamington, Nuneaton Borough, Notts County, Aston Villa and Tranmere Rovers.

Competitions

League Two

League table

Results summary

Results by matchday

Matches
On Thursday, 20 June 2019, the EFL League Two fixtures were revealed.

FA Cup

The first round draw was made on 21 October 2019. The second round draw was made live on 11 November from Chichester City's stadium, Oaklands Park.

EFL Cup

The first round draw was made on 20 June.

EFL Trophy

On 9 July 2019, the pre-determined group stage draw was announced with Invited clubs to be drawn on 12 July 2019. The draw for the second round was made on 16 November 2019 live on Sky Sports. The third round draw was confirmed on 5 December 2019.

Transfers

Transfers in

Loans in

Loans out

Transfers out

Player statistics

Appearances and goals

References

Walsall
Walsall F.C. seasons